Arzuvaj (also Romanized as Ārzūvaj, Arezūvaj, and Orzūvaj; also known as Āzrūvaj) is a village in Korzan Rud Rural District, in the Central District of Tuyserkan County, Hamadan Province, Iran. At the 2006 census, its population was 169, in 54 families.

References 

Populated places in Tuyserkan County